Miguel Ángel Álvarez, also known as "El Men," (August 25, 1941 – January 16, 2011), was a Puerto Rican actor and comedian.

Early years
Álvarez was born in San Juan, Puerto Rico, and when he was a child his family moved to Bayamón, Puerto Rico, where he was raised and received his primary and secondary education.

Career
Álvarez began his artistic career as a radio announcer, working for radio station WIAC, which was broadcasting out of Yauco and Bayamón. On October 31, 1950, Álvarez was among a group of reporters who covered the gunfight at Salón Boricua between Vidal Santiago Díaz, a Nationalist who was the personal barber of Pedro Albizu Campos, and forty police and National Guardsmen during the San Juan Nationalist revolt. This event made Puerto Rican radio history because it was the first time that an event of this nature was transmitted live via the radio airwaves to the public in general.

He later participated on the radio show El Tremendo Hotel (The Tremendous Hotel), starring Ramón Rivero "Diplo", and later Álvarez was contracted to do radionovelas (radio soap operas).

The Puerto Rican playwright Francisco Arriví invited Álvarez to appear in three of his plays. The three plays in which Álvarez made his theatrical debut were Club de Solteros (Bachelors Club), El Caso del Muerto en Vida (The Case of the Living Dead), and María Soledad (Lonely Maria). On one occasion Álvarez was asked to stand in for Jacobo Morales in the theater production of El Cielo se rinde al Amanecer (The Sky Surrenders at Dawn) because Morales was feeling ill and he had to learn the script that very night. He acted alongside Juano Hernández in the play "Widows Walk" which was presented at the University of Puerto Rico Theater.

Álvarez's popularity grew and soon he was filming movies in various countries. Among the countries in which he filmed besides Puerto Rico were Spain, Mexico, Venezuela, Colombia, the Dominican Republic, and the United States. In 1965, he was given one of the leading roles in the Mexican film, "El Señor Doctor" (Mr. Doctor), with Cantinflas and Marta Romero. After he returned to Puerto Rico he participated in a comedy entitled Johnny "El Men" (Johnny the Man), which was about the struggles of a Puerto Rican in New York City. It was from this comedy that Álvarez took the nickname "El Men", a name which would accompany him for the rest of his life.

Filmography

Later years
Álvarez directed four movies for Columbia Pictures. These were Arocho y Clemente, Dos Contra el Destino (Two Against Destiny), Natas es Satán and El Alcalde Machuchal.

In 1984, he starred, along with Leopoldo "Pucho" Fernández, in a local TV comedy series called Barrio 4 Calles in which he played the owner of a bakery shop who was in competition, and constant conflict, with the owner of the bakery shop across the street. He also appeared in El Kiosko Budweiser. Álvarez was married numerous times including to actress Gladys Rodríguez and singer Evelyn Souffront.

Later in life, Álvarez suffered respiratory problems and was admitted to the Hospital Metropolitano in the town of Guaynabo. Álvarez died in said hospital on January 16, 2011.

See also 

List of Puerto Ricans

References

External links

Burials at Santa María Magdalena de Pazzis Cemetery
Puerto Rican male film actors
Puerto Rican male television actors
Puerto Rican comedians
Puerto Rican journalists
People from San Juan, Puerto Rico
2011 deaths
1941 births